Consolatio peccatorum, seu Processus Luciferi contra Jesum Christum is a tract written by Jacobus de Teramo in around 1382. This "consolation of sinners" (with the colophon Liber Bellial)  is a lawsuit between Lucifer and Jesus Christ, Solomon presiding, in which the Devil is suing Christ for having trespassed by descending into Hell. 

At the first trial Moses is counsel for Jesus Christ and Belial for the Devil. At the second trial the Patriarch Joseph is judge, Aristotle and Isaiah defend Jesus Christ, and the Emperor Augustus and Jeremiah defend the Devil. 

In both trials the decision is in favor of Christ, but at the second trial the Devil is granted the right to take possession of the bodies and souls of the damned at the Last Judgment. 

This work was printed repeatedly and translated into several languages (as Das Buch Belial it was printed at Augsburg, 1472, and, illustrated with woodcuts, 1473) but was later placed on the Index Librorum Prohibitorum. Another edition in Latin was printed by Gerard Leeu in Gouda in 1481.

It was printed as late as 1611 at Hanover, as Processus Luciferi contra Iesum coram Iudice Salomone .

Weblinks 
 Jacobi de Ancharano (alias de Teramo): Litigatio Christi cum Belial German translation with pictures - BSB Cgm 48, [S.l.], 1461 (pictures Belial at hellhole, Litigatio Christi cum Belial)
 Jacobus de Teramo: Liber Belial De Consolatione Peccatorum Vicentie, 1506
 Jacobus de Teramo: Consolatio peccatorum seu processus Belial translated to French by frère Pierre Ferget, 1487 

 

Judgment in Christianity
1380s books
Lawsuits against God